ETH Zurich (English: ETH; Swiss Federal Institute of Technology in Zürich) is a public research university in Zürich, Switzerland. Founded by the Swiss federal government in 1854, it was modeled on the École polytechnique in Paris, with the stated mission to educate engineers and scientists; the school focuses primarily on science, technology, engineering, and mathematics, although its 16 departments span a variety of disciplines and subjects. 

Like its sister institution, the Swiss Federal Institute of Technology in Lausanne (EPFL), ETH Zurich is part of the Swiss Federal Institutes of Technology Domain, a consortium of government universities and research institutes under the Swiss Federal Department of Economic Affairs, Education and Research. As a public institution, it grants admission to every Swiss resident who has matriculated. , ETH Zurich enrolled 24,500 students from over 120 countries, of which 4,460 were pursuing doctoral degrees.

ETH Zurich has a world-class reputation in academia and industry, particular in science and technology. It regularly ranks among the top three to five universities in Europe and one of the top 15 to 20 globally. In the 2022 QS World University Rankings, the university ranked eighth in the world and fourth in Europe in academic excellence, with 2021 edition placing it fourth in the world for engineering and technology (second in Europe) and first for earth and marine science. The Times Higher Education World University Rankings of 2022-23 ranked ETH Zurich 11th worldwide.

Students, faculty, and researchers affiliated with ETH Zurich include 22 Nobel laureates, two Fields Medalists, three Pritzker Prize winners, and one Turing Award recipient, including Albert Einstein and John von Neumann. It is a founding member of the IDEA League and the International Alliance of Research Universities (IARU), and a member of the CESAER network.

History

ETH Zurich was founded on 7 February 1854 by the Swiss Confederation and began giving its first lectures on 16 October 1855 as a polytechnic institute (eidgenössische polytechnische Schule) at various sites throughout the city of Zürich. It was initially composed of six faculties: architecture, civil engineering, mechanical engineering, chemistry, forestry, and an integrated department for the fields of mathematics, natural sciences, literature, and social and political sciences.

It is locally still known as Polytechnikum, or simply as Poly, derived from the original name eidgenössische polytechnische Schule, which translates to "federal polytechnic school".

ETH Zurich is a federal institute (i.e., under direct administration by the Swiss government), whereas the University of Zurich is a cantonal institution. The decision for a new federal university was heavily disputed at the time; the liberals pressed for a "federal university", while the conservative forces wanted all universities to remain under cantonal control, worried that the liberals would gain more political power than they already had. In the beginning, both universities were co-located in the buildings of the University of Zurich.

From 1905 to 1908, under the presidency of Jérôme Franel, the course program of ETH Zurich was restructured to that of a real university and ETH Zurich was granted the right to award doctorates. In 1909 the first doctorates were awarded. In 1911, it was given its current name, Eidgenössische Technische Hochschule. In 1924, another reorganization structured the university in 12 departments. However, it now has 16 departments.

ETH Zurich, the EPFL, and four associated research institutes form the "ETH Domain" with the aim of collaborating on scientific projects.

Reputation and ranking

ETH Zurich is ranked among the top universities in the world. Typically, popular rankings place the institution as the best university in continental Europe and ETH Zurich is consistently ranked among the top 1-5 universities in Europe, and among the top 3-10 best universities of the world.

Historically, ETH Zurich has achieved its reputation particularly in the fields of chemistry, mathematics and physics. There are 32 Nobel laureates who are associated with ETH Zurich, the most recent of whom is Richard F. Heck, awarded the Nobel Prize in chemistry in 2010. Albert Einstein is perhaps its most famous alumnus.

In the 2021 edition of the QS World University Rankings, ETH Zurich again ranked 6th in the world, having first achieved this position in 2019, thereby overtaking the University of Cambridge and becoming the second-best European university after the University of Oxford. Also, ETH was ranked 8th in the Times Higher Education World University Rankings of 2020. In the 2020 QS World University Rankings by subject, it was ranked 4th in the world for engineering and technology (2nd in Europe, 1st in continental Europe) and 1st for earth & marine science.

In 2018, QS World University Rankings placed ETH Zurich at 7th overall in the world. In 2015, ETH Zurich was ranked 5th in the world in engineering, science and technology, just behind the Massachusetts Institute of Technology, Stanford University and Cambridge University. In 2015, ETH Zurich also ranked 6th in the world in Natural Sciences, and in 2016 ranked 1st in the world for Earth & Marine Sciences for the second consecutive year.

In 2016, Times Higher Education World University Rankings placed ETH Zurich 9th overall in the world and 8th in the world in engineering & technology, just behind the Massachusetts Institute of Technology, Stanford University, California Institute of Technology, Princeton University, Cambridge University, Imperial College London and Oxford University.

In a comparison of Swiss universities by swissUP Ranking and in rankings published by CHE comparing the universities of German-speaking countries, ETH Zurich traditionally is ranked first in natural sciences, computer science and engineering sciences.

In the survey "CHE ExcellenceRanking" on the quality of Western European graduate school programs in the fields of biology, chemistry, physics and mathematics, ETH Zurich was assessed as one of the three institutions to have excellent programs in all the considered fields, the other two being Imperial College London and the University of Cambridge, respectively. ETH Zurich had a total budget of CHF 1,897 billion in the year 2019.

Admission and education

For Swiss students, ETH Zurich is not selective in its undergraduate admission procedures. Like every public university in Switzerland, ETH Zurich is obliged to grant admission to every Swiss resident who took the Matura. Applicants from foreign countries are required to take either the reduced entrance exam or the comprehensive entrance exam although some applicants from several European countries are exempt from this rule. An applicant can be admitted to ETH Zurich even without any verifiable educational records by passing the comprehensive entrance exam.

As at all universities in Switzerland, the academic year is divided into two semesters. Examinations are often held during examination sessions which are immediately before the beginning of the next semester (only a few select courses offer an exam immediately after the semester ends). After the first year of study, bachelor students must pass a block examination of all courses taken in the first year, called the Basisprüfung (basis examination). If the weighted average score is not sufficient, a student is required to retake the entire Basisprüfung which usually means having to re-sit the whole first year.
The structure of examinations in higher academic years is similar to the Basisprüfung, but with a higher success rate.
The regular time to reach graduation is six semesters for the Bachelor of Science degree and three or four further semesters for the Master of Science degree. The final semester is dedicated to writing a thesis.

Education at ETH Zurich generally focuses more on theoretical aspects than application and most degree programs contain a high amount of mathematical training. The main language of instruction in undergraduate (Bachelor) studies is German and for admission a proof of sufficient knowledge of the German language is required for Bachelor students. Most Master's programs and doctoral studies are in English.

Campus

ETH Zurich has two campuses. The main building was constructed 1858–1864 outside and right above the eastern border of the town, but nowadays it is located right in the heart of the city. As the town and university grew, ETH Zurich spread into the surrounding vineyards and later quarters. As a result, the Zentrum campus consists of various buildings and institutions throughout Zürich and firmly integrates the ETH Zurich in the city. The main building stands directly across the street from the University Hospital of Zurich and the University of Zurich.

Because this geographic situation substantially hindered the expansion of ETH Zurich, a new campus was built from 1964 to 1976 on the Hönggerberg on a northern hill in the outskirts of the city. The last major expansion project of this new campus was completed in 2003; since then, the Hönggerberg location houses the departments of architecture, civil engineering, biology, chemistry, materials science and physics.

Main building

The main building of ETH Zurich was built from 1858 to 1864 under Gustav Zeuner; the architect, however, was Gottfried Semper, who was a professor of architecture at ETH Zurich at the time and one of the most important architectural writers and theorists of the age. Semper worked in a neoclassical style that was unique to him; and the namesake and architect of the Semperoper in Dresden. It emphasized bold and clear massings with a detailing, such as the rusticated ground level and giant order above, that derived in part from the work of Andrea Palladio and Donato Bramante. During the construction of the University of Zurich, the south wing of the building was allocated to the University until its own new main building was constructed (1912–1914). At about the same time, Semper's ETH Zurich building was enlarged and received its impressive cupola. The university's engineering and computer science departments are located around here.

Hönggerberg campus
In the year of ETH Zurich's 150th anniversary, an extensive project called "Science City" for the Hönggerberg Campus was started with the goal to transform the campus into an attractive district based on the principle of sustainability. The university's science departments are located around here.

An ASVZ sports center which is accessible to all students and faculty, and includes a gym, beach volleyball court, football field, and martial-art rooms.

Commuting between the campuses

ETH Link 
The ETH link is a free bus for students, affiliates and faculty linking the two campuses. During the school week, the bus runs 3 times an hour, and takes around 15 minutes. In 2020 a new, fully electric, ETH eLink was introduced.

Bike share 
Since 2018, an electric bike sharing system between the two campuses is also available, with yearly subscriptions subsidised by the university. There are rental stations on both campuses.

ETH Laboratory of Ion Beam Physics
The ETH Laboratory of Ion Beam Physics (LIB) is a physics laboratory located in Science City. It specializes in accelerator mass spectrometry (AMS) and the use of ion beam based techniques with applications in archeology, earth sciences, life sciences, material sciences and fundamental physics. An example of such application is the tracing of isotopes and the detection of rare radionuclides with radiocarbon dating and the use of techniques such as Rutherford backscattering spectrometry or elastic recoil detection. The LIB is developing the next generation of AMS machines. It is also a laboratory available for users interested in applying the techniques of ion beam analysis.

Student life

Tuition and financial assistance 
Being a public university, the heavily subsidized (by Swiss federal tax) tuition fees are CHF 730 per semester, regardless of the student's nationality.
Both merit and need based scholarships are also available. 
The Excellence Scholarship & Opportunity Programme (ESOP) is a merit scholarship program for master students with excellent grades in their undergraduate program.

Student associations 
ETH Zurich has well over 100 student associations. Most notable is the VSETH (Verband der Studierenden an der ETH) which comprises all department associations. The associations regularly organize events with varying size and popularity. Events of the neighboring University of Zurich are well-attended by ETH Zurich students and vice versa. The VSETH organizes events of greater public attention, such as the Polyball, the Polyparty (does not exist any more) and the Erstsemestrigenfest, the first two housed in the main building of ETH Zurich. Sometimes, the annual Erstsemestrigenfest takes place at extraordinary locations, for example the Zurich Airport. All freshmen enjoy special treatment at that event.

Some of the notable associations that are not affiliated with a specific department are the ETH Entrepreneur Club and ETH Model United Nations. Both enjoy high international standings, and are regularly awarded for excellence in their respective fields. ETH Juniors is another student organization. It forms a bridge between industry and ETH Zurich and offers many services for students and companies alike.

Sports 
The Academic Sports Association of Zurich (ASVZ) offers more than 120 sports. The biggest annual sports event is the SOLA-Stafette (SOLA relay race) which consists of 14 sections over a total distance of 140 kilometers. More than 760 teams participated in the 2009 edition. The 40th edition of the SOLA, held on 4 May 2013, had 900 enrolled teams, of which 893 started and 876 were classified. In 2014 ASVZ celebrated their 75th anniversary.

Innovation

Student Project House
In 2017, ETH Zurich board approved the creation of a "Student Project House" to encourage student projects and foster innovation. A test consisting of a "makerspace" and co-working space was established on the Hönggerberg campus, followed by a 6-story space near the ETH Zurich main building. Both locations function as a unified entity for the purpose of qualifications, staffing and decision making. While both makerspaces offer similar tools, the central one is significantly larger and also hosts a rentable auditorium, intended for pitching projects to faculty to gain funding, and a bar. Both makerspaces include workspaces for wood- and metalworking, electronics fabrication, as well as an array of 3D-printers for students to use at a little over material cost. Both also feature a shop for students to buy items such as resistors in lower quantities than ordinarily, while passing down the savings of bulk purchases. The makerspaces are managed and staffed entirely by students, who are paid in shop credit. A new space is expected to open on the Hönggerberg campus in 2024.

Spin-offs
ETH Zurich promotes technology and knowledge transfer through an entrepreneurial ecosystem to foster spin-offs and start-​ups. 
As of 2022, 527 ETH Zurich spin-off companies had been created.

Competition teams
ETH Zurich has three prominent competition teams that perform research in different popular fields and compete on the world stage. Most of these teams are based in the Swiss Innovation Park near Dübendorf.

ARIS
The Swiss Academic Spaceflight Initiative (ARIS) is an organisation at ETH Zurich that focuses on the development of space related technologies. The most prominent area of research is in the development of a sounding rocket that is flown yearly at the Spaceport America Cup. ARIS also dedicates its resources to the academic advancement of spaceflight and hosts projects ranging from the development of Hybrid rocket Engines to Payload research.

Achievements

 ARIS won 2nd place at the Spaceport America Cup 2019 in the 10'000 ft COTS Engine challenge.

AMZ
The Academic Motorsports Association is the ETH Zurich's equivalent of a Formula One team, that develops electric and driverless sports vehicles that compete at Formula Student.

Achievements

AMZ has proven to be one of the most successful teams in the Formula Student history, with in total 13 overall victories (as by September 2021) at Formula Student Events. Highlight was the double victory at the Formula Student Germany (FSG) in the Electric as well as the Driverless Category (autonomous driving car). 
Furthermore, AMZ was leader of the Formula Student world ranking in 2013 - 2015, 2017 & 2018. The team also dominated the autonomous driving category since its introduction in 2017 for three years, winning all the events the team attended with the autonomous car until FSG 2021. 
In 2015, and again since 2016, their car grimsel holds the official Guinness world record for fastest acceleration of an electric car, achieving 0-100 km/h in 1.513 seconds.

Swissloop

Swissloop is the ETH Zurich's newest competition team that is working on the development of a Hyperloop system.

Traditions
The annual Polyball is the most prestigious public event at ETH Zurich, with a long tradition since the 1880s. At the end of November, the Polyball welcomes around 10,000 dancers, music-lovers and partygoers in the extensively decorated main building of ETH Zurich. This is the biggest decorated ball in Europe.

The amicable rivalry between ETH Zurich and its neighbor, the University of Zurich, has been cultivated since 1951 (Uni-Poly). There has been an annual rowing match between teams from the two institutions on the river Limmat.

There are many regular symposia and conferences at ETH Zurich, most notably the annual Wolfgang Pauli Lectures, in honor of former ETH Zurich Professor Wolfgang Pauli. Distinct lecturers, among them 24 Nobel laureates, have held lectures of the various fields of natural sciences at this conference since 1962.

Notable alumni and faculty

ETH Zurich has produced and attracted many famous scientists in its short history, including Albert Einstein and John von Neumann. More than twenty Nobel laureates have either studied at ETH Zurich or were awarded the Nobel Prize for their work achieved at ETH Zurich. Other alumni include scientists who were distinguished with the highest accolades such as the Fields Medal, Pritzker Prize and Turing Award, among other distinctions in their respective fields. Academic achievements aside, ETH Zurich has been alma mater to many Olympic medalists and world champions.

Related organizations

Collegium Helveticum
The Collegium Helveticum is an Institute for Advanced Study.  It is jointly supported and operated by the ETH Zurich, the University of Zurich and the Zurich University of the Arts. It is dedicated to transdisciplinary research and acts as a think tank as well. Fellows are elected for five years to work together on a particular subject. For the period 2016–2020, the research focus is on digital societies.

ETH Zurich Foundation
The ETH Zurich Foundation is a legal entity on its own (a Swiss non-profit foundation) and as such not part of the ETH Zurich. Its purpose is to raise funds to support chosen institutes, projects, faculty and students at the ETH Zurich. It receives charitable donations from companies, foundations and private individuals. It can be compared with university endowments in the USA. However, the ETH Zurich is a public university so that the funds of this foundation are much smaller than at comparable private universities.
Examples of funded teaching and research are:
 New institutes such as the Wyss Translational Center Zurich
 Additional professorships
 Rössler Prize
 Pioneer fellowships
 Excellence scholarships

Military Academy
The Military Academy is an institution for the education, training and development of career officers of the Swiss Armed Forces. The scientific part of this organization is attached to the ETH Zurich, while other parts such as training and an assessment center are under the direct management of the defense sector of the Swiss Federal Government.

Swiss National Supercomputing Center
The Swiss National Supercomputing Center is an autonomous organizational unit of the ETH Zurich. It is a national facility based in Lugano-Cornaredo, offering high-performance computing services for Swiss-based scientists.

ChainSecurity
ChainSecurity is a spin-off founded by ETH Professor Martin Vechev and the former ETH doctoral students Hubert Ritzdorf and Petar Tsankov. The company’s overall goal is to make blockchain technologies more secure. To that end, it develops and operates automated scanning programs for auditing smart contracts. Providers of smart contracts can ask ChainSecurity to audit them and thus receive certification for the security of their contracts.

Gallery

See also

École Polytechnique Fédérale de Lausanne (Swiss Federal Institute of Technology in Lausanne, EPFL)
Engineering
Laboratory for Energy Conversion
List of universities in Switzerland
List of largest universities by enrollment in Switzerland
List of forestry universities and colleges
Science and technology in Switzerland
2000-watt society
Disney Research
e-rara.ch
Swiss Electromagnetics Research and Engineering Centre
ETH Zurich University Archives
:Category:ETH Zurich alumni
:Category:Academic staff of ETH Zurich

References

Further reading

External links

 
Education in Zürich
Technical universities and colleges in Switzerland
ETH Domain
Forestry education
Forestry in Switzerland
Universities in Switzerland
Educational institutions established in 1854
1854 establishments in Switzerland
Buildings and structures in Zürich
Cultural property of national significance in the canton of Zürich
Neoclassical architecture in Switzerland
Accelerator mass spectrometry